The French River is a river in south-central Massachusetts and northeastern Connecticut, USA.

The river rises near Leicester, Massachusetts, and flows generally southwards through Auburn, Oxford, and along the town line between Webster and Dudley; it then enters Connecticut where it joins the Quinebaug River at Thompson, just northeast of Putnam. The Quinebaug in turn flows into the Shetucket River and ultimately the Thames River to empty into the Long Island Sound.

French River was so named from a settlement of French Protestants in Oxford.

See also
List of rivers of Connecticut
List of rivers of Massachusetts

References

Further reading 

 USGS French River Basin
 Massachusetts Executive Department of Environmental Affairs

Rivers of Worcester County, Massachusetts
Rivers of Windham County, Connecticut
Rivers of Massachusetts
Rivers of Connecticut
Tributaries of the Thames River (Connecticut)
Huguenot history in the United States